An Other Cup is the twelfth studio album by Yusuf (formerly known as Cat Stevens), released on 10 November 2006 in Germany, 13 November in the UK and the US and worldwide on 14 November. It is Yusuf's first Western pop album since Back to Earth, which was released in 1978 under the name Cat Stevens. An Other Cup is Cat Stevens's first new studio album under the name Yusuf Islam since returning to Western pop music.

History
On the album cover, the singer is credited as "Yusuf" with a cover label identifying him as "the artist formerly known as Cat Stevens". In an interview as to why he presented both names, he said, "You know, the cup is there to be filled... with whatever you want to fill it with. For those people looking for Cat Stevens, they'll probably find him in this record. If you want to find Yusuf, go a bit deeper, you'll find him."

Craig Kallman, the chief executive officer of Atlantic Records, has described the new record as speaking to "the essence of all the great Cat Stevens albums of the past", adding: "It was a chilling experience sitting in a very tiny rehearsal room as he was working through all the new material."

On the BBC's Andrew Marr Show, Islam said: "It's me, so it's going to sound like that of course... This is the real thing [...] When my son brought the guitar back into the house, you know, that was the turning point. It opened a flood of, of new ideas and music which I think a lot of people would connect with." In another interview, Islam said, "I feel right about making music and singing about life in this fragile world again. It is important for me to be able to help bridge the cultural gaps others are sometimes frightened to cross."

The album was produced by Rick Nowels and Islam, and is distributed by Atlantic Records in North America, in a venture with Islam's own label, Ya Records. It features guest performances from Youssou N'Dour. Additional guests, Alun Davies and Jean Roussel, two of Islam's long time friends, who both played in his band as Cat Stevens from 1970 in Davies' case, during the time he was writing and recording Mona Bone Jakon, and 1973 for Roussell during Stevens' Catch Bull at Four, album and tour. Both worked, recorded, and toured with Stevens, until he left the Western pop music business in 1978; however both made an appearance with him, performing on Stevens' first television broadcast performance, performing with him, on Later... with Jools Holland in 2006. However, this was the only performance where Roussell was present. Davies remained as a guitarist with backing vocals as he had done for so many years in the days of "Cat Stevens", and still performs with Islam as part of his new, tight-knit band. Artwork is credited to "Yoriyos", believed to be Yusuf Islam's son Mohammed Islam, also a musician.

The album features a cover of "Don't Let Me Be Misunderstood". "Heaven/Where True Love Goes", released as a download-only single, is taken from the last part of the "Foreigner Suite" that appeared on the album Foreigner, with some words changed to fit his new Islamic faith. The album also features a slightly new version of "I Think I See the Light" from Mona Bone Jakon.

The full album was first available to hear exclusively in the 'Mes Amis' Members Area of Yusuf's website, until it was then released as a CD.

The album debuted at No. 52 on the Billboard 200, and was certified platinum in Germany and gold in the UK.

Track listing
All songs written by Yusuf Islam, except where noted.

"Midday (Avoid City After Dark)" – 4:24
"Heaven/Where True Love Goes" – 4:49
"Maybe There's a World" – 3:06
"One Day at a Time" – 4:54
"When Butterflies Leave" – 0:41
"In the End" – 4:02
"Don't Let Me Be Misunderstood" (Bennie Benjamin, Gloria Caldwell, Sol Marcus) – 3:22
"I Think I See the Light" – 5:34
"Whispers from a Spiritual Garden" – 2:04
"The Beloved" – 4:51
"Greenfields, Golden Sands" – 3:25
"There Is Peace" – 3:03 (Bonus track on the UK edition)

Charts

Weekly charts

Year-end charts

References

External links
An Other Cup official web site
"Letting the Cat back out"
"Heaven/Where True Love Goes" free, legal video-stream

2006 albums
Atlantic Records albums
Yusuf Islam albums
Albums produced by Rick Nowels
Polydor Records albums